The Comedy may refer to:

 Dante's Divine Comedy
 The Comedy (film), 2012 film directed by Rick Alverson
The Comedy (album), a 1962 album by the Modern Jazz Quartet